In the Garden is the second album by the progressive rock band Gypsy, their second for Metromedia. It peaked at #173 on the Billboard Pop Albums charts in 1971, and was produced by Clark Burroughs of vocal group The Hi-Lo's.

In the Garden was re-released by Bedrock Records in 1999.

Track listing
All songs by Enrico Rosenbaum except as noted. A bonus track, "20 Years Ago Today", was released on the Bedrock Records re-issue.

 "Around You" – 5:27
 "Reach Out Your Hand" – 2:33
 "As Far as You Can See (As Much as You Can Feel)" (Rosenbaum with intro by Lordan/Walsh) – 12:09
 "Here in the Garden I" – 6:43
 "Here in the Garden II" – 3:07
 "Blind Man" – 3:59
 "Time Will Make It Better" (Walsh) – 2:53

Personnel
Enrico Rosenbaum – guitar, vocals
James Walsh – keyboards, vocals
James Johnson – guitar, vocals
Bill Lordan – drums
Willie Weeks – bass
Joe Lala – percussion

Production notes
Produced by Clark Burroughs
Engineered by Jerry Barnes

References

External links
 Gypsy Tribute site

1971 albums
Gypsy (band) albums